Eugen Ritter von Knilling (1 August 1865 – 20 October 1927 in Munich) was the Prime Minister of Bavaria from 1922 to 1924.

Biography
Knilling was born in 1865 in Munich. He studied law at the University of Munich. From 1912 to 1918, he served as the minister for education in the government of the Kingdom of Bavaria. From 1920 to 1922, he was a member of the Bavarian parliament for the BVP. He became Prime Minister of Bavaria in 1922.

In September 1923, following a period of turmoil, Knilling declared martial law, appointing Gustav von Kahr as State Commissar with almost dictatorial powers. He was taken prisoner by Rudolf Hess during the Beer Hall Putsch of 1923. In 1924 he resigned, exasperated with politics, and returned to a civil service post.

Knilling died in Munich in 1927 at the age of 62.

Sources
  Universitätsbibliothek Regensburg: Bosls bayerische Biographie author: Karl Bosl - Regensburg, publisher: Pustet

References

External links
Picture of Eugen von Knilling, published in 1921 Historisches Lexikon Bayerns

Bavarian People's Party politicians
Ministers-President of Bavaria
Opposers who participated in the Beer Hall Putsch
Ludwig Maximilian University of Munich alumni
People from the Kingdom of Bavaria
Politicians from Munich
1856 births
1927 deaths